Macropelobates is an extinct genus of prehistoric frogs. It was described by Gladwyn Kingsley Noble based on material from Oligocene of Mongolia.

Species
The genus contains two species:
 Macropelobates linquensis (J. Yang, 1977) — Shandong, China
 Macropelobates osborni Noble, 1924 — Tsagan Nor Basin, Mongolia
The two species are similar, however, and might be synonymous.

See also

 Prehistoric amphibian
 List of prehistoric amphibians

References

Pelobatidae
Miocene amphibians
Prehistoric amphibian genera
Prehistoric frogs
Oligocene amphibians
Prehistoric amphibians of Asia
Fossil taxa described in 1924
Taxa named by Gladwyn Kingsley Noble